In association football, jockeying (also called “shepherding” or "guiding") is the defender's skill of keeping between the attacker and his or her intended target (usually the goal). It requires the defender to slow down or delay the attacker by backing off slowly while at  the same time trying to force an error or make a successful tackle.

The defender should be in a low position with both knees bent, turned slightly at an angle from the attacker.

References

Association football skills
Association football terminology